Route 48 is a limited stop bus, identified as a "Quickbus", operated by the Maryland Transit Administration in Baltimore and its suburbs.  The line currently runs from the University of Maryland Transit Center to Towson along the York Road/Greenmount Avenue corridor.  Service operates Monday through Saturday every 15 minutes between 5:30 AM. and 6:30 PM.

Route 48 is identical to the local Route 8 bus, except that it does not operate along the segment between Towson and Lutherville. But unlike the Route 8 local bus, the 48 does not stop at every bus stop along its route.  Rather, its stops are limited to certain locations of importance, including transfer points to other bus lines, major landmarks, and other busy intersections selected by MTA. In all, there are 28 stops along the route.

History
The Route 48 Quickbus began service on August 30, 2009, replacing the Route 8 Express 
Bus. It was the second of Quickbus route initiated by MTA; Route 40 was rebranded as the MTA's first Quickbus on January 30, 2007.

The no. 48 designation has previously been used for several streetcar and bus routes, including the No. 48 Streetcar, which operated between Mt. Washington and Belvedere loop in 1949-50 along the present route of Route 27, the SEET Shuttle which operated briefly 1988-89, and a series of routes for students of the Baltimore City Public Schools that operated 1997-2004.

BaltimoreLink
Route 48 will be replaced by CityLink Red on June 18, 2017 as part of the BaltimoreLink transit overhaul program.

External links
Route 48 Schedule Effective August 31, 2009

References

Maryland Transit Administration bus routes
Bus rapid transit in Maryland
2009 establishments in Maryland